George Hugh Kidd Macalister (3 May 1879 – 2 November 1930) was a medical doctor, Professor of Clinical Medicine and Lecturer on Therapeutics, King Edward VII College of Medicine in Singapore, from 1918 until his death.

Family 

He was the youngest son of Alexander Macalister, professor of anatomy at Cambridge University. Brother to R.A. Stewart Macalister, Edith Florence Boyle Macalister, Margaret Anne MacDougal Macalister. Widower of Norah O'Brien Tandy (died in childbirth). Husband of Margaret Gray Moir. Margaret and he went on to have two daughters. Elspeth Macalister and Jean Moira Edith Macalister. He was cousin to Donald MacAlister.

References

Sources

 ‘MACALISTER, George Hugh Kidd’, Who Was Who, A & C Black, an imprint of Bloomsbury Publishing plc, 1920–2008; online edn, Oxford University Press, Dec 2007 accessed 8 March 2013
 
 
 
  
 ‘And I knew Everything Was Going to be All Right’, A Personal Memoir by Elspeth Horne, Edited by Polly Gould, Published by Morrow & Co 2015. 

1879 births
1930 deaths